Lipman is the name of:

People with the surname
 Alan Lipman, American clinical psychologist and pundit
 Daniel Lipman, writer and producer from Baltimore, Maryland, United States
 David J. Lipman, American biologist and director of the National Center for Biotechnology Information (NCBI)
 Elinor Lipman, American novelist
 Emma Lipman, English-Maltese footballer
 Esther Lipman MBE née Solomon (1900–1991), Adelaide, South Australia's first woman councillor
 Hymen Lipman (also Hyman Lipman), who first patented the pencil with an attached eraser
 Ira A. Lipman (born c. 1941), American businessman and philanthropist
 Jacob Goodale Lipman, soil chemist
 Jonas Alfred Lipman (born 1877), Australian stage and film actor, producer and director
 Joseph Lipman, Canadian-American mathematician
 Kirov Lipman, Latvian businessman and ice hockey executive
 Lori Lipman Brown, Nevada state senator
 Maria Lipman, Russian journalist and political scientist
 Matthew Lipman, founder of Philosophy for Children
 Maureen Lipman, British actress and comedian
 Mel Lipman, attorney from Nevada and father of Lori Lipman Brown
 Michael Lipman, English rugby union player
 Samuel Lipman (1934–1994), music and cultural critic, pianist, and co-founder (with Hilton Kramer) of The New Criterion literary magazine
 Ted Lipman (1953-  ) Canadian diplomat and sinologist

People with the given name
 Lipman Bers, Latvian mathematician & activist
 Lipman "Lip" Emanuel Pike, American home run champion baseball player

See also
 Lipmann
 Lippman
 Lippmann
 Liepmann

Notes 

Jewish surnames